Barry Kivel is an American actor, director, editor, and producer who appeared in Crocodile Dundee (1984), Memoirs of an Invisible Man (1992), Coneheads (1993), Bound (1996), One Fine Day (1996), Body and Soul (2000), Turn of Faith (2001), and Q-4: Dream Corporation (2016), a futuristic thriller which is in post-production. To his credits, he has produced Three Sides (2011), a short film. As an editor, he also has edited Three Sides (2011). He also directed Three Sides. He received a special thanks for the 2016 documentary film The Natural: The Best There Ever Was, which is completed, and he has a role in there as Pat McGee and himself. In television he has acted on serial police drama Hill Street Blues, sitcom Full House, sitcom Who's the Boss?, sitcom Empty Nest, legal drama Civil Wars, sitcom Murphy Brown, legal drama Brooklyn South, television drama Judging Amy, and sitcom Scrubs.

Film career

Kivel made his film debut in The Natural (1984), a baseball film about Roy Hobbs, showcasing the successes and sufferings of the player. He next appeared along with Timothy Hutton, Robert Urich, and Kim Cattrall in the drama film Turk 182! (1985). The next year he appeared in the crocodile hunting film, Crocodile, as a Coke snorter. In 1991, he appeared along Sally Field, Robert Downey Jr., and Kevin Kline in the comedy film Soapdish. He then made two appearances in 1992 in film with Memoirs of an Invisible Man and a TV Movie Carol Leifer: Gaudy, Bawdy & Blue. In 1993, he appeared in Science fiction comedy film Coneheads as a doctor.
	 	 
In 1994, he appeared in the comedy Attack of the 5 Ft. 2 Women. In 1996, he first appeared in neo-noir crime thriller Bound, which is about a woman wanting to escape her relationship with her mafioso boyfriend and enters a hidden affair with an charming ex-con. Later in the year, he played Mr. Yates, Jr. in romantic comedy One Fine Day. He was absent for four years in film, and then appeared in 2000 in Body and Soul in boxing film as Willie, in a film about Charlie Davis, a determined small-town boxer who travels to Reno, Nevada and loses himself, and the people he cares for most. He next appeared in the 2002 film alongside Ray Mancini, Mia Sara, Costas Mandylor, and Alan Gelfant in Turn of Faith, which follows three friends who grow up in a tough neighborhood and they choose very different paths. 
	 
In 2005, he appeared in a short film as Marty Punion, one of the main stars. In 2011, he directed, produced, and filmed the short drama film Three Sides, about a young woman, who searches for her biological mother, forcing three people to reconsider their life choices. In 2016 he did a film called Q-4: Dream Corporation, an innovate thriller about the government trying to run people's sleeping habits. He is also credited the baseball documentary The Natural: The Best There Ever Was which is an upcoming film.

Filmography

Filmography

Television

References

American film directors
American film producers
Place of birth missing (living people)
Year of birth missing (living people)
American film editors
Living people